

This is a list of the Sites of Special Scientific Interest (SSSIs) in Gloucestershire. Natural England, the designating body for SSSIs in England, uses the 1974-1996 county system, and this list follows the same approach. Some sites you may expect to find here could therefore be in the Avon list. It may also be that a site may on the borders of more than one county. It may also be on the country borders.

Natural England chooses a site because of its fauna, flora, geological or physiographical features. As of 2012, there are 121 sites designated in this Area of Search, of which 69 have been designated due to their biological interest, 32 due to their geological interest, and 20 for both.

Gloucestershire has 3 Areas of Outstanding Natural Beauty being the Cotswolds, Malvern Hills, and the Wye Valley (the latter is also partly in Wales).  These areas may include several SSSIs, or be named an SSSI as is the case for the Malvern Hills.

Gloucestershire has 2 designated Ramsar sites being the Severn Estuary and Walmore Common both SSSIs. These two sites are also designated as Special Protection Areas (SPA) under the EC Directive on the conservation of Wild Birds.

Gloucestershire has 7 recognised Special Areas of Conservation (SAC), several of which bring together more than one SSSI.  These are: Cotswold Beechwoods; Dixton Wood; River Wye/ Afon Gwy; Rodborough Common; Severn Estuary; Wye Valley and Forest of Dean Bat Sites/ Safleoedd Ystlumod Dyffryn Gwy a Fforest y Ddena; Wye Valley Woodlands/ Coetiroedd Dyffryn Gwy.

Highbury Wood SSSI and the Cotswold Commons and Beechwoods SSSI are national nature reserves (NNR). Lady Park Wood (part of the wood is in Gloucestershire and part in Monmouthshire) is a national nature reserve.

A significant number of the SSSIs are recognised by the relevant local authorities as Key Wildlife Sites and Regionally Important Geological/Geomorphological Sites. There are c. 800 recognised Key Wildlife Sites in Gloucestershire.

For other counties, see List of SSSIs by Area of Search.

Sites

See also
 Gloucestershire Wildlife Trust
 Wildfowl and Wetlands Trust
 Royal Society for the Protection of Birds
 Woodland Trust
 Forestry Commission

Notes 
Data rounded to one decimal place.
Grid reference is based on the British national grid reference system, also known as OSGB36, and is the system used by the Ordnance Survey.
Link to maps using the Nature on the Map service provided by Natural England.

References

Natural England citation sheets for each SSSI. Retrieved on 18 June 2011 and 10 August 2012

 Alderton Hill Quarry
 Ashleworth Ham
 Astridge Wood
 Badgeworth
 Barnsley Warren
 Barton Bushes
 Bigsweir Woods
 Blaisdon Hall
 Bourton Down
 Box Farm Meadows
 Boxwell
 Brassey Reserve And Windrush Valley
 Brooks Head Grove
 Buckshraft Mine & Bradley Hill Railway Tunnel
 Bull Cross, The Frith And Juniper Hill 
 Bushley Muzzard, Brimpsfield 
 Caerwood And Ashberry Goose House 
 Campden Tunnel Gravel Pit 
 Chaceley Meadow
 Clarke's Pool Meadow
 Cleeve Common
 Coaley Wood Quarries
 Cockleford Marsh
 Collinpark Wood 
 Coombe Hill 
 Coombe Hill Canal 
 Cotswold Commons And Beechwoods 
 Cotswold Water Park 
 Crickley Hill And Barrow Wake 
 Daneway Banks 
 Dean Hall Coach House & Cellar 
 Devil's Chapel Scowles 
 Dingle Wood
 Dixton Wood 
 Dymock Woods 
 Easter Park Farm Quarry 
 Edge Common 
 Edgehills Quarry
 Elmlea Meadows
 Foss Cross Quarry
 Frampton Pools 
 Garden Cliff 
 Hampen Railway Cutting 
 Haresfield Beacon 
 Harford Railway Cutting 
 Highbury Wood 
 Hobb's Quarry, Longhope
 Hornsleasow Quarry 
 Hornsleasow Roughs 
 Hucclecote Meadows 
 Huntsman's Quarry 
 Innsworth Meadow 
 Jackdaw Quarry 
 Juniper Hill, Edgeworth 
 Kemble Railway Cuttings 
 Kempley Daffodil Meadow 
 Kingscote And Horsley Woods 
 Knap House Quarry, Birdlip 
 Land Grove Quarry, Mitcheldean 
 Lark Wood 
 Leckhampton Hill And Charlton Kings Common
 Lineover Wood
 Longhope Hill 
 Lower Wye Gorge 
 Lydney Cliff 
 May Hill 
 Meezy Hurst 
 Minchinhampton Common
 Nagshead 
 New Park Quarry 
 Nibley Knoll 
 Notgrove Railway Cutting 
 Oakenhill Railway Cutting
 Old Bow And Old Ham Mines
 Old River Severn, Upper Lode
 Pennsylvania Fields, Sedbury
 Poor's Allotment 
 Puckham Woods
 Puddlebrook Quarry 
 Purton Passage 
 Range Farm Fields 
 River Wye 
 Robin's Wood Hill Quarry 
 Rodborough Common 
 Rough Bank, Miserden
 Salmonsbury Meadows
 Scully Grove Quarry 
 Selsley Common
 Severn Estuary 
 Severn Ham, Tewkesbury 
 Shorn Cliff And Caswell Woods 
 Slade Brook 
 Soudley Ponds 
 Speech House Oaks 
 Stenders Quarry 
 Stinchcombe Hill
 Stony Furlong Railway Cutting
 Strawberry Banks
 Swanpool Wood And Furnace Grove
 Swift's Hill
 Sylvan House Barn
 The Hudnalls
 The Malvern Hills
 Tudor Farm Bank
 Turvey's Piece
 Upham Meadow And Summer Leasow
 Upper Severn Estuary
 Upper Wye Gorge
 Veizey's Quarry
 Wainlode Cliff
 Walmore Common
 Wellacre Quarry
 Westbury Brook Ironstone Mine
 Whelford Meadow
 Wigpool Ironstone Mine
 Wildmoorway Meadows 
 Winson Meadows
 Wood Green Quarry & Railway Cutting 
 Woodchester Park 
 Wotton Hill
 Yarley Meadows 

Sites of Special Scientific Interest in Gloucestershire
Gloucestershire
Sites